Ion Gheorghe (born 8 October 1999) is a Romanian professional footballer who plays as a midfielder for Liga I club Sepsi OSK.

Club career
Gheorghe joined Voluntari from fellow Liga I team Dinamo București in August 2018.

On 19 May 2022, he was left out of the squad to play Sepsi OSK in the Cupa României final after having previously agreed to join the opponent club upon the expiration of his contract with Voluntari.

Career statistics

Club

Notes

Honours
Voluntari
Cupa României runner-up: 2021–22
Sepsi OSK 
Supercupa României: 2022

References

External links

1999 births
Living people
Footballers from Bucharest
Romanian footballers
Association football midfielders
Liga I players
Liga III players
FC Dinamo București players
FC Voluntari players
Sepsi OSK Sfântu Gheorghe players
Romania youth international footballers
Olympic footballers of Romania
Footballers at the 2020 Summer Olympics